Twilight Train is a 1957 South Korean film directed by Kim Ki-young. It was the debut film for actors Ahn Sung-ki and Kim Ji-mee.

Synopsis
Kim Ji-mee plays the daughter of Choi Sam, president of the orphanage. Kim Ji-mee is in love with Park Am, who is vice-president of the orphanage. However, both Choi Sam and Park Am are in love with Do Kum-bong, a dancer who came from the orphanage. The two men fight to try to win her love

Cast
 Park Am
 Do Kum-bong
 Choi Sam
 Kim Ji-mee
 Ahn Sung-ki

References

External links 
 
 The Twilight Train on KMDb (in Korean)

1957 films
1950s Korean-language films
South Korean romantic drama films
Films directed by Kim Ki-young